CJIV-FM was a Canadian radio station broadcasting at 97.3 FM in Dryden, Ontario, Canada with a Christian format.

History
On February 7, 2003, Way of Life Broadcasting received approval from the Canadian Radio-television and Telecommunications Commission to operate a new low-power Christian music format. The new station would broadcast at 97.3 MHz with 50 watts. The station was launched on March 17, 2003.

On February 20, 2013, Way of Life Broadcasting has requested the revocation of its broadcasting licence for CJIV-FM, as of September 1, 2013, as they contended that it does not have the listenership to justify operating the station. Consequently, it will cease broadcasting by no later than August 31, 2013, the expiry date for the licence.

References

External links
CJIV-FM
 

Jiv
Jiv
Mass media in Dryden, Ontario
Jiv
Radio stations established in 2003
Radio stations disestablished in 2013
2003 establishments in Ontario
2013 disestablishments in Ontario
JIV-FM